Jean-Marie Géhu (3 April 1930 - 15 February 2014) was a French botanist. He received his BSc in Biology in 1952, his MSc in 1955, and his PhD in Botany in 1961 from Lille University.

As professor of botany at the Faculty of Pharmacy of Lille, he founded in 1975, with his wife Jeanette Géhu-Franck, in Bailleul, the Centre régional de Phytosociologie, which was certified as a "Conservatoire botanique national de Bailleul" in 1991.

He was mainly known for his works on phytosociology, plant ecology and his vegetation studies applied to nature conservation. He was a specialist in European coastal vegetations. He also played a major role in the characterization of the plant communities of Algeria.

He was the Secretary General of the Fédération internationale de phytosociologie from 2000 until his death. In 2010, he was honored at an international symposium on the one hundredth anniversary of phytosociology.

He was appointed a Chevalier de la Légion d'honneur on 31 December 2001.

Publications 
 
 
 
 
 
 
 
 
 
 
 

Jean-Marie Géhu was also the publisher of the collection « Colloques Phytosociologiques » :
 
 
 
 
 
 
 
 ...
 ...
 
 
  et 
 
 ...

References 

Chevaliers of the Légion d'honneur
1930 births
2014 deaths
20th-century French botanists
21st-century French botanists